Waverton is a civil parish in Cheshire West and Chester, England. It contains 17 buildings that are recorded in the National Heritage List for England as designated listed buildings.  Of these, one is listed at Grade II*, the middle grade, and the others are at Grade II.  Apart from the village of Waverton, the parish is rural.  Passing through the parish is the Shropshire Union Canal, and three of the bridges crossing this are listed.  The other listed buildings in the parish include the parish church, a sundial in the churchyard and the churchyard walls, a former steam mill, a former railway station and goods shed, a former school, a former institute, and a war memorial, together with houses and cottages.

Key

Buildings

References
Citations

Sources

Listed buildings in Cheshire West and Chester
Lists of listed buildings in Cheshire